Fabrice Goldstein (born 25 February 1972) is a French film producer.

Career
His film The Names of Love produced by Goldstein, Antoine Rein, and Caroline Adrian was awarded two César Awards in 2011, including best female lead for Sara Forestier and best writing.

Filmography

Features 
 2019: La lutte des classes
 2017 : Just to Be Sure
 2017: I Got Life!
 2016: Juillet août
 2015: The Very Private Life of Mister Sim
 2015: I'm All Yours
 2014: Des lendemains qui chantent
 2013: Queens of the Ring
 2012: Du vent dans mes mollets
 2012: Un jour mon père viendra
 2010: Djinns
 2010: Les meilleurs amis du monde
 2010: The Names of Love
 2009: Rien de personnel
 2008: Vilaine
 2007: Les murs porteurs
 2007: J'veux pas que tu t'en ailles
 2004: J'me sens pas belle

Shorts 
 2013: J'aime beaucoup ta mère
 2013: La femme qui flottait
 2011: J'aurais pu être une pute
 2010: Aglaée
 2010: La coagulation des jours
 2008: Arrêt demandé
 2006: Chair fraîche
 2006: Le Mozart des pickpockets
 2006: Du pain et des fraises
 2006: Le Steak
 2005: 40 mg d'amour par jour
 2005: Patiente 69
 2004: Connaissance du monde (drame psychologique)
 2004: Le droit chemin
 2004: Frédérique amoureuse
 2003: Abîmes
 2003: Après
 2003: Le tarif de Dieu
 2003: Wolfpack
 2002: Mi-temps
 2002: Bois ta Suze
 2002: You Sure?
 2001: Premier nu
 1999: Touchez pas à ma poule !

References

French film producers
Living people
Film people from Paris
1972 births